Tauqeer Hussain (born 6 October 1981) is a Pakistani-Spanish cricketer  who played domestic cricket for Faisalabad. In March 2019, he was named in Spain's Twenty20 International (T20I) squad for the 2019 Spain Triangular T20I Series. He made his T20I debut for Spain, against Malta, on 29 March 2019.

References

External links
 

1981 births
Living people
Pakistani cricketers
Spanish cricketers
Spain Twenty20 International cricketers
Faisalabad cricketers
Cricketers from Faisalabad